The Worthingtons are a historic English family from Lancashire, traceable to the beginning of the 13th century. The progenitor of the line was Worthington de Worthington (born 1236), and the family were Lords of the Manor of Worthington, Standish, Lancashire from the 13th to the 18th centuries. The family seat was Worthington Hall, Standish, County Lancashire; partially demolished in the mid-20th century, the remaining Tudor doorway dated 1577 Edward de Worthington.

Since the mid-16th century they have been maternal ancestors of the Brice family, who often take Worthington as a given name. Other Worthington descendants would later become the Worthington-Evans baronets and the Craven baronets. They have connections through marriage to the Earl of Aylesford, the Lawson Baronets, the Baron Jeffreys, the Baron Stafford, and the Baron Feversham.

Coat of arms
Dating from the 15th century, the Worthington coat of arms is argent, three dung forks sable. The arms can be considered a rebus, “worthing” being an archaic slang term for dung. The crest is a goat statant argent, holding in the mouth an oak branch vert, fructed or; the motto, "Virtute Dignus Avorum" (in virtue worthy of ones ancestors). The motto and coat of arms may be seen in Chorley Church, Winslow Parish, Cheshire, England.

References

English families
Medieval English families
English gentry families

Links 
Worthington Family History Society